Protégé  is a 2007 Hong Kong-Singaporean co-produced crime drama film written and directed by Derek Yee, starring Andy Lau, Daniel Wu, Louis Koo, Zhang Jingchu and Anita Yuen.

Plot
Undercover officer Nick had spent the last seven years penetrating into the core of a drug ring, working his way up from a street dealer post to the managerial position handling cargo deliveries for Kwan – the biggest player in the local heroin market. When the ailing Kwan makes Nick his protégé, Nick cannot help but sway before money and power and starts to perform his role like a real drug trafficker. This, together with his affair with heroin-addict Fan, causes Nick to become more and more confused about his true identity, and eventually leads to a disastrous end.

The film begins with a scene in a dark isolated rundown apartment building, showing a heroin addict living poorly with her young daughter. The scene then forwards to the perspective of Officer Nick who is suffering from loneliness just after completing an undercover assignment. He recalls the entire story of what happened and the events to lead to his emptiness.

Towards the end of the film, Nick finally builds a case strong enough to catch Kwan. However, Kwan realizes he has no way out and commits suicide traumatizing Nick because Kwan has put so much trust and faith in Nick, treating him like family. In addition, he finds that Fan who he had been looking after throughout the film, died of an overdose, discovering her body with rats on it. Due to this trauma, Nick completely goes into a breakdown. Swearing vengeance, and knowing that Fan's drug addicted husband was responsible for her death and encouraged her multiple times, Nick tricks Fan's husband into doing a drug run, however it turns out to be a trip to Singapore, and arriving at Changi Airport, Nick sets a trap with Singaporean customs officials to arrest Fan's husband on the spot. Nick then coldly informs Fan's husband that its over and that he will receive the death penalty under Singapore Law. Nick then returns home to Hong Kong, but is deeply affected by the death's of Kwan and Fan. He considers using drugs himself and just before he does, Fan's surviving daughter comes in and throws the drugs away saving Nick and silently reminding him he has something to live for.

Cast
Andy Lau as Lam Kwan
Daniel Wu as Nick (Lee Chi-lik)
Louis Koo as Fan's husband
Zhang Jingchu as Fan (Pang Yuk-fan)
Anita Yuen as Kwan's wife
Derek Yee as Miu Chi-wah
He Meitian as Kwan's sister in-law
Liu Kai-chi as HKCED Customs Chief
Nirut Sirijanya as Gen Chanchai
Qi Yuwu as a Singaporean custom's official (Cameo Appearance)

Critical reception
The film received generally positive reviews. Perry Lam, for example, wrote in Muse magazine, 'The movie is powerful precisely because it doesn't preach, and therefore spares us all the usual opinions, standard platitudes and naive assumptions about drug dealing and addiction.'

DVD release
Region 1 DVD (US & Canada)

On 24 February 2009 Dragon Dynasty, released "Protégé" on Region 1 DVD:

Special Features:
Feature Length Audio Commentary with Hong Kong Cinema Expert Bey Logan
The Making of Protégé Undercover & Over the Edge: An Exclusive Interview with Leading Man Daniel Wu
Chasing the Dragon: An Exclusive Interview with Leading Lady Zhang Jingchu
The Dealer: An Exclusive Interview with Producer Peter Chan
Original Theatrical Trailer

Awards and nominations

References

External links
 
 
 
 
 HK cinemagic entry

Cantonese-language films
2007 films
2007 crime drama films
Hong Kong crime drama films
Films set in Hong Kong
Films set in Thailand
Films set in Singapore
Films directed by Derek Yee
Films about heroin addiction
Films about the illegal drug trade
Polybona Films films
2000s Hong Kong films